Nuno Borges and Francisco Cabral were the two-time defending champions but only Cabral chose to defend his title, partnering João Domingues. Cabral lost in the quarterfinals to Sadio Doumbia and Fabien Reboul.

Doumbia and Reboul won the title after defeating Robert Galloway and Alex Lawson 6–3, 3–6, [15–13] in the final.

Seeds

Draw

References

External links
 Main draw

Open de Oeiras III - Doubles